Jordan Hunter (born 6 December 1999) is an English professional footballer who plays for South Shields.

Career
Hunter signed for Sunderland in July 2018, having left Liverpool the previous month. He made his senior debut on 13 November 2018, in the EFL Trophy. He moved on loan to South Shields in August 2019.

He left Sunderland at the end of the 2019–20 season after rejecting a two-year contract offer, returning to South Shields on a permanent basis in July 2020 on a three-year deal.

References

1999 births
Living people
English footballers
Liverpool F.C. players
Sunderland A.F.C. players
Association football midfielders
South Shields F.C. (1974) players